Sibonga, officially the Municipality of Sibonga,  is a 3rd class municipality in the province of Cebu, Philippines. According to the 2020 census, it has a population of 53,424 people.

Sibonga is bordered to the north by the city of Carcar, to the west are the towns of Barili and Dumanjug, to the east is the Cebu Strait, and to the south is the town of Argao.

History

The town fiesta is every August 10 every year, this celebrates the feast of Saint Philomena &  October 11 Our Lady of the Pillar. Sibonga has 2 patron saints: Saint Philomena and Our Lady of the Pillar. One of the highlights of the fiesta is the Bonga Festival which features cultural dancing and the town's local produce. It is a home of many historical houses built in the Spanish era. Tulay or wharf is a common place where people of Sibonga and visitors spend time to relax - sightseeing, camping and merely having a siesta time. The Catholic Church is one of the most beautiful Churches in Cebu. It has a beautiful Tan Tinoy Park (named after a former barrio captain Tinoy) in front of the Sibonga Municipal Office. The escuela (school) houses during the Spanish era are still standing adjacent to the Catholic Church. There is Tubig Mainit (hot water) spring in Barangay Can-aga.

Geography

Barangays
Sibonga comprises 25 barangays:

Climate

Demographics

Economy

Sibonga has begun developing the town to become more industrial while still preserving its natural bounty. Sibonga is abundant in root crops, corn, rice, coconuts among others. The public market is held every Saturday in Poblacion. Each barangay has its own agora or marketplace with its own specific days of function. For example, in Barangay Papan, people from neighboring barangays convene in every Thursday for trade.

Sibonga now has Sibonga Community College which offers 4-year courses to its inhabitants.

Culture

Pastores de Sibonga

Pastores de Sibonga is a short Christmas play which narrates the nativity as performed in Magcagong. The play depicts the shepherds' adoration of the child Jesus.  Pastores de Sibonga dates back to the 1920s.

Pastores de Sibonga is performed by at least four dancers. The female dancer wears a red blouse or shirt paired with a long white skirt. The male dancer wears a red shirt paired with black pants. Accessories include a round hat decorated with cut-outs of the sun, moon and stars in yellow, red, green, and other brightly colored papers together with a yellow sash placed across the body. It is performed used red fans and white handkerchiefs. An oval-shaped native fan is used and held by the right hand during the performance. The white square handkerchief is held by the left hand folded into a triangular shape.

The accompaniment music is a rondalla – an ensemble (guitar, bandurria, and banjo), played with the plectrum. The lyrics tell of the pre-, nativity, and post-nativity settings. It expresses happiness, joy, and worship, and offers praises and gifts for Jesus, Mary and Joseph.

Notable personalities

 Gloria Sevilla - actress
 Amapola Cabase - singer, musician, actress

References

Sources

External links

 [ Philippine Standard Geographic Code]

Municipalities of Cebu
Cebuano culture
Culture of Cebu